William F. Shortz (born August 26, 1952) is an American puzzle creator and editor who is the crossword puzzle editor for The New York Times. He graduated from Indiana University with a degree in the invented field of "enigmatology". After starting his career at Penny Press and Games magazine, he was hired by The New York Times in 1993. Shortz's American Crossword Puzzle Tournament is the country's oldest and largest crossword tournament.

Early life and education
Will Shortz was born and raised on an Arabian horse farm in Crawfordsville, Indiana. He was drawn to puzzles at an early age; in eighth grade he wrote a paper titled “Puzzles as a Profession.” (The paper earned him a B+.) At age 13, Shortz wrote to Language on Vacation author Dmitri Borgmann for advice on how to pursue a career in puzzles. At age 16, Shortz began regularly contributing crossword puzzles to Dell publications. He eventually graduated from Indiana University in 1974, and is the only person known to hold a college degree in enigmatology, the study of puzzles. Shortz wrote his thesis about the history of American word puzzles. Shortz achieved this by designing his own curriculum through Indiana University's Individualized Major Program. He also earned a Juris Doctor degree from the University of Virginia School of Law (1977), but did not sit for the bar exam and began a career in puzzles instead. Shortz is the author or editor of more than 100 books and owns over 20,000 puzzle books and magazines dating back to 1545, reportedly the world's largest private library on the subject.  He is a member and historian of the National Puzzlers' League.

Career
Shortz began his career at Penny Press Magazines, then moved to Games magazine for 15 years, serving as its editor from 1989 to 1990, when the magazine temporarily folded. He was rehired in late 1991, then let go in August 1993. A few months later he became the crossword puzzle editor for The New York Times, the fourth in the paper's history, following Eugene Thomas Maleska. 

Shortz has been the puzzle master on NPR's Weekend Edition Sunday since the program was started in 1987. He is the founder of the American Crossword Puzzle Tournament (1978), and has served as its director since that time. He founded the World Puzzle Championship in 1992 and is a director of the U.S. Puzzle Team. Shortz is also weekly guest on NPR's Weekend Edition Sunday where he hosts the Sunday Puzzle, a cooperative game between the show's host and one of the show's listeners.  The lucky player is picked randomly from a group of submissions containing the correct answer to a qualifier puzzle issued the week before.

In February 2009, Shortz helped introduce the KenKen puzzle into The New York Times. In 2013, Shortz lent his name and talents in puzzle writing and editing to a new bimonthly publication entitled Will Shortz' WordPlay, published by Penny Press. He has said that his favorite crossword of all time is the Election Day crossword of November 5, 1996, designed by Jeremiah Farrell.  It had two correct solutions with the same set of clues, one saying that the "Lead story in tomorrow's newspaper (!)" would be "BOB DOLE ELECTED", and the other correct solution saying "CLINTON ELECTED". His favorite individual clue is "It might turn into a different story" (whose solution is SPIRAL STAIRCASE).

Controversies 
In 2017, Shortz published a Times crossword by a prisoner named Lonnie Burton who was convicted of raping a 15-year-old boy, in addition to having burglary and robbery charges, prompting backlash from some solvers. Shortz did not include the reason for Burton's imprisonment in his accompanying blog post. Burton had previously had crosswords published in The Los Angeles Times. The Times public editor Liz Spayd wrote in an article on the decision, "What I question is the decision not to tell readers what Burton did. [...] I understand Shortz’ reflex to hold back such dark information given the levity of a puzzle, but not doing so may have made matters worse. It left some readers with the feeling of being tricked." 

At various times in his career Shortz has apologized for cluing decisions that sparked public backlash for being racist, sexist or offensive.

In 2019, The New York Times issued an apology after Shortz chose to publish the racial slur "BEANER" in the crossword, cluing it as "Pitch to the head, informally". Shortz admitted that he saw the derogatory definition when he researched the word, but claimed he had never personally heard it, and explained that as long as a word also has a "benign" meaning, it meets his editorial standards for publication. Shortz defended his use of "BEANER" and noted he has published and stands by the benign meanings of the terms "CHINK" and "GO OK" (or "GOOK"), both slurs for people of Asian descent.

In 2020, more than 600 crossword constructors and solvers signed an open letter to the executive director of Times puzzles asking for changes and expressing concerns regarding the diversity within the puzzle department at the Times and the puzzle itself. The letter also described the resignation of Claire Muscat, a woman who was hired as a test-solver, who resigned because of what she described as being hired to provide a perfunctory token female perspective.

Honors and awards

 On May 3, 2008, Shortz gave the commencement speech for his alma mater, Indiana University. As an introduction to his speech, Shortz quizzed the audience on well-known IU graduates and their unconventional majors. He advised recent graduates to pick a career in which they "don't mind the least interesting parts." Shortz apparently also wrote brainteasers and a hidden message that were included in the printed commencement program.
 In May 2010, he was given an honorary Doctor of Humane Letters degree from Wabash College in Crawfordsville, Indiana.
 In 2012, he received the Sam Loyd Award from the Association for Games & Puzzles International for creating interest in mechanical puzzles.
 In May 2016, he gave the commencement speech at the University of Virginia Law School Commencement.
 In May 2018, Shortz was given an honorary Doctor of Humane Letters degree from Indiana University.

In popular culture

Television appearances 

 Shortz has been a guest on a number of TV talk shows, including Martha Stewart Living, Oprah, The Daily Show, and The Colbert Report.  
 He has also appeared on Millionaire as an expert for the "Ask the Expert" lifeline.  
 Shortz appeared on an episode of The Simpsons titled "Homer and Lisa Exchange Cross Words", which first aired on November 16, 2008. 
 Shortz later appeared in Dinner: Impossible as himself, challenging the chef to create dishes that mimic common English idioms at the annual American Crossword Puzzle Tournament. The episode aired on May 6, 2009. 
 He appeared on an episode of How I Met Your Mother titled "Robots Versus Wrestlers", which first aired on May 10, 2010 during season 5. He appeared as himself at an upscale dinner party that included Arianna Huffington and Peter Bogdanovich, also playing themselves.
 On December 18, 2015, he presented the answers on Jeopardy! in the category "The New York Times Crossword". 
 Shortz was mentioned in passing in Brooklyn Nine-Nine episodes "The Mattress" and "Mr.Santiago" before guest-starring in the 2018 episode "The Puzzle Master" as Sam Jepson, a rival puzzler to Vin Stermley.
 In 2018, Shortz was featured on HBO's Real Sports with Bryant Gumbel (ep. 254, May 2018).
 In 2020, Shortz was the "central character" on an episode of To Tell the Truth. Actress Gillian Jacobs identified him almost immediately due to recognizing his voice from Weekend Edition on NPR.

Movie appearances 

 Shortz provided the puzzle clues which The Riddler (Jim Carrey) leaves for Batman (Val Kilmer) in the 1995 film Batman Forever.
 The 2006 documentary Wordplay by Patrick Creadon focuses on Shortz and the American Crossword Puzzle Tournament. Various famous fans of his puzzles such as Bill Clinton, Ken Burns, Jon Stewart, Daniel Okrent, Indigo Girls and Mike Mussina appear in the film.

Personal life 
Shortz resides in Pleasantville, New York, where he works from home. He is an avid table tennis player. In May 2011, with Barbadian champion (and his long-time friend) Robert Roberts, he opened one of the largest table tennis clubs in the Northeast in Pleasantville.  In 2012, Shortz set a goal for himself to play table tennis every day for a year, but surpassed his goal, playing for 1000 consecutive days, and then eventually reaching a streak of 10 years in 2022. In his free time, Shortz also enjoys biking, reading, traveling, and collecting antique puzzle books. Shortz stated in a February 2023 interview that he has a male partner and that they intend to get married.

References

1952 births
20th-century LGBT people
21st-century LGBT people
Crossword compilers
Indiana University Bloomington alumni
LGBT people from Indiana
LGBT people from New York (state)
Living people
NPR personalities
People from Crawfordsville, Indiana
People from Pleasantville, New York
Puzzle designers
The New York Times editors
University of Virginia School of Law alumni